The Harold Johnson Nature Reserve is a small nature reserve on the KwaZulu-Natal north coast.

Wildlife species include zebra, bushbuck, impala, blue, red duiker and grey duiker, vervet monkey, slender mongoose, white-tailed mongoose, banded mongoose and porcupine. Over 190 bird species have been observed in the reserve.  One hundred and fourteen butterflies species have been recorded.

Two national monuments are located within the boundaries: Fort Pearson and the Ultimatum Tree. In 1879 the British presented an ultimatum to the Zulu nation at the Ultimatum Tree on the banks of the Tugela River; this ultimatum precipitated the Anglo Zulu War.

See also
List of heritage sites in KwaZulu–Natal

Notes and references 

 
 

Protected areas of KwaZulu-Natal